Edwin Stephenson (1871–1922) was an English cathedral organist, who served in St. Philip's Cathedral, Birmingham.

Background
He was born in Windermere, Cumbria in 1871. He was a pupil at the Royal College of Music.

His career started early when at the age of 14 he was appointed to Cartmel Priory as organist.

He was a proponent of Tudor church music and he published the Lamentations of Robert Whyte (a former organist at St. Margaret's Church, Westminster).

At a time when many organ recitals favoured transcriptions of orchestral works, Stephenson eschewed them in favour of organ compositions. His recital programmes included the sonatas and larger chorale fantasias of Max Reger and the later symphonies of Charles Widor.

Career
Organist of:
Cartmel Priory 1888–1891
Holy Trinity Church, Sunningdale 1891–1901
St Michael's Church, Brighton 1901–1905
St Nicholas' Church, Brighton 1905–1906
St. Philip's Cathedral, Birmingham 1906–1914
St. Margaret's Church, Westminster 1914–1922

References

English classical organists
British male organists
Cathedral organists
1871 births
1922 deaths
People from Windermere, Cumbria
Alumni of the Royal College of Music
Male classical organists